Jan Kazimierz Chodkiewicz (1616–1660) was a Polonized Lithuanian nobleman (szlachcic).

Jan Kazimierz was Master of the Stables of Lithuania from 20 July 1633 and castellan of Vilnius from 13 April 1646. He married Zofia Pac on 31 August 1636 in Vilnius.

He died in 1660 and was buried in Brzostownica Wielka, Lithuania.

See also
 Lithuanian nobility

1616 births
1660 deaths
Jan Kazimierz
17th-century Polish nobility